Dallgow-Döberitz is a railway station located in Dallgow-Döberitz, Germany. The station is located on the Berlin-Lehrte Railway. The train services are operated by Deutsche Bahn and Ostdeutsche Eisenbahn (ODEG).

The station was opened with the construction of the Berlin–Lehrte railway in 1871 as Dallgow. It was renamed Dallgow-Döberitz in 1898. In 1996, as the railway was converted into a high-speed line, an island platform was built for the regional traffic.

Train services
The station is serves by the following service(s):

Regional services  Rathenow - Wustermark - Berlin - Ludwigsfelde - Jüterbog
Peak hour services  Wustermark - Berlin-Spandau

References

External links

Railway stations in Brandenburg
Buildings and structures in Havelland (district)
Railway stations in Germany opened in 1871